Naxos is a city and a former municipality on the island of Naxos, in the Cyclades, Greece. Since the 2011 local government reform it is part of the municipality Naxos and Lesser Cyclades, of which it is the seat and a municipal unit. The municipal unit has 12,726 inhabitants, and the community 7,374 inhabitants (2011 census). It is located on the west side of Naxos Island in the Cyclades island group in the Aegean. It was the centre of archaic Cycladic culture. It shares the island of Naxos with the municipal unit of Drymalia.

History

Ancient Greek Naxos 
During the 8th and 7th centuries BC, Naxos dominated commerce in the Cyclades.

Revolt of Naxos 
In 502 BC the inhabitants of Naxos rebelled against their masters in the Persian Empire; this revolt led to the larger Ionian Revolt, and then to the Persian War between Greece and Persia.

The Dukes of Naxos 

In the aftermath of the Fourth Crusade, with a Latin Emperor under the influence of the Venetians established at Constantinople, the Venetian Marco Sanudo conquered the island and soon captured the rest of the islands of the Cyclades, establishing himself as Duke of Naxia, or Duke of the Archipelago. Twenty-one dukes in two dynasties (Crispo) ruled the Archipelago, until 1566; Venetian rule continued in scattered islands of the Aegean until 1714.

Ottoman Naxos (1564-1821) 
The Ottoman administration remained essentially in the hands of the Venetians; the Porte's concern was satisfied by the returns of taxes. Very few Turks ever settled on Naxos, and Turkish influence on the island is slight. Turkish sovereignty lasted until 1821, when the islands revolted; Naxos finally became a member of the Greek state in 1832.

Historical Population

Notable people
Kostas Manolas (born 1991), footballer

References

External links 

  (in Greek)

Naxos
Cities in ancient Greece
Populated places in the ancient Aegean islands
Greek city-states
Members of the Delian League
Populated places in Naxos (regional unit)